Butrick is a surname. Notable people with the surname include:

Daniel Sabin Butrick (1789–1851), American missionary
Merritt Butrick (1959–1989), American actor